Mike Tebulo (born 5 June 1985 in Zomba, Malawi) is a Malawian long-distance runner.

Biography
He competed in the men's marathon at the 2012 Summer Olympics and was the flag bearer for the Malawi team at the opening ceremony. In the marathon, he finished 44th with a seasonal best time of 2:19:11.

References 

Living people
1985 births
People from Zomba District
Malawian male long-distance runners
Malawian male marathon runners
Olympic athletes of Malawi
Athletes (track and field) at the 2012 Summer Olympics
Athletes (track and field) at the 2006 Commonwealth Games
Athletes (track and field) at the 2010 Commonwealth Games
Commonwealth Games competitors for Malawi
World Athletics Championships athletes for Malawi